The president of the Socio-Political Chamber was the presiding officer of the Socio-Political Chamber of the Federal Assembly of Yugoslavia.

Office-holders
Krsto Popivoda 1963 – 1967
Velimir Stojnić 1967 – ?
Radomir Komatina ? – 1974 ?

Sources
Various editions of The Europa World Year Book

Socio-Political Chamber, Speakers
Yugoslavia, Socio-Political Chamber